Kilmore   is a housing area of Dublin, Ireland, on the borders of the suburbs of Coolock, Artane, Santry and Beaumont. A smaller area within it is known as Kilmore West. The area is mostly housing estates, although there are public facilities such as schools, parks, shops and community centers. There is also a library and sports pitches nearby.

Location and details 
The town is situated in an area bordering the towns of Coolock to the east and north, Santry to the west and Beaumont and Artane to the south. It lies between the Dublin 17 and Dublin 5 postal districts. There are three housing estates in Kilmore, Cromcastle, Castletimon and Kilbarron.

See also 
Kilmore West

References

Towns and villages in Dublin (city)